Crystal Simorgh for Best Screenplay is an award presented annually by the Fajr International Film Festival held in Iran.

Winners and nominees

Most wins and nominations

Crystal Simorgh for Best Adapted Screenplay 

Crystal Simorgh for Best Adapted Screenplay is an award which established in 2006 but only awarded three times in 2009, 2010 and 2012. Nominations of this award were not announced.

Winners

Notes

References 

Screenplay
 
Screenwriting awards for film